The 1970–71 NHL season was the 54th season of the National Hockey League. Two new teams, the Buffalo Sabres and Vancouver Canucks made their debuts and were both put into the East Division. The Chicago Black Hawks were moved to the West Division.  The Montreal Canadiens won the Stanley Cup by beating the Black Hawks in seven games in the finals.

League business
The NHL added two expansion teams in Buffalo and Vancouver.

At the beginning of the season, the Oakland Seals were renamed California Golden Seals.

From this season through the 2002–03 season, teams wore their white (or yellow) jerseys at home and their colored jerseys on the road.

Regular season
For 1970–71 the NHL went to a balanced schedule, with each team playing each other team six times, three at home and three on the road, without regard to divisional alignment. Nevertheless, playoff qualification was determined entirely by divisional standings, with the top four teams in each division qualifying.

This season saw a marked increase in goal scoring, especially by the Boston Bruins, who shattered scoring records as they set the mark for most goals by a team (399) by nearly a hundred over the previous record holder. They also set records for most victories (57) and points (121). Phil Esposito set records for most goals in a season with 76 and for most points with 152. Defenceman Bobby Orr won his second consecutive Hart Memorial Trophy and set a new record for assists with 102. The Bruins also had the four league leading scorers, the first time in history this was achieved (the only other time being by the Bruins in 1974), and seven of the top eleven leading scorers, the only time in NHL history this has ever been achieved. They had 6 of the top 8 scorers in the league. Furthermore, the Bruins set marks for the highest scoring single season marks at every position: center (Esposito), left wing (Johnny Bucyk with 116), right wing (Ken Hodge with 105) and defence (Orr), as well as for a forward line (Esposito centering Wayne Cashman and Hodge).

Boston won the East Division championship in a runaway. In the West Division, the powerful Chicago Black Hawks had been moved there partially to accommodate the expansion Buffalo Sabres and Vancouver Canucks (both of which were placed in the East Division) but more in an effort to provide greater balance between the divisions. Chicago broke St. Louis' stranglehold over the division, winning handily over the Blues and advancing to the Stanley Cup finals.

The Montreal Canadiens, who missed the playoffs in 1969–70, appeared to be sinking once more. Players did not like Claude Ruel's dictatorial rule as coach, and Ralph Backstrom and John Ferguson retired. Ruel resigned and Al MacNeil took over. Both Ferguson and Backstrom returned, but
Backstrom was later traded to Los Angeles for draft choices.

The Vancouver Canucks played well at first and were around the .500 mark at mid-season. Then Orland Kurtenbach was injured and the team sagged.

On October 29, Gordie Howe became the first player to record 1,000 assists in a 5–3 win
over Boston at the Detroit Olympia.

Detroit introduced a fine rookie goaltender, Jim Rutherford, who had bright moments
despite the Red Wings last place finish. However, they suffered their worst defeat in
franchise history January 2, when Toronto crushed them 13–0.
Sid Abel, the team's general manager, asked owner Bruce Norris
if he could dismiss coach Ned Harkness. Told that he could not, 
Abel resigned. Norris then elevated Harkness to general manager and
Doug Barkley was named coach. Detroit took a tumble to the basement of the East Division after that.

On March 12, Boston's Phil Esposito broke Bobby Hull's record for goals by a player in
a season at 7:03 of the first period on Denis DeJordy of Los Angeles at the Forum in
Inglewood, California. Then, at 15:40 he became the first player to score 60 goals.
The Bruins won 7–2.

Buffalo had a star, Gilbert Perreault, who on March 18 broke Nels Stewart's (and Danny Grant's, and Norm Ferguson's) rookie record with his 35th goal in a 5–3 win over St. Louis. He went on to finish the season with 38.

Billy Taylor and Don Gallinger, now middle-aged, were finally forgiven for their gambling in 1948 and were reinstated to the NHL. However, they did not return to the NHL.

Final standings

Playoffs

Format change
Due to three straight years of non-competitive finals (where the West Division winning St. Louis Blues were swept all 3 years by an established East Division club); the NHL changed the match-ups for the semifinals by having the winner of the series of the 1st vs. 3rd East Division teams play the winner of the 2nd vs. 4th West Division teams. Similarly, the other semifinal series pitted the winner of the 1st vs. 3rd West Division teams against the winner of the 2nd vs. 4th East Division teams. Combined with the transfer of the Chicago Black Hawks into the West Division (which previously consisted only of expansion teams), the Stanley Cup Final series was expected to be more competitive. The realignment and change in playoff format brought the desired results in that each Stanley Cup Final for the next 3 years was either between two East Division teams or Montreal vs Chicago. None of the finals were sweeps. Until realignment in 1974–75 when the original six and expansion teams were more thoroughly mixed, the Philadelphia Flyers were the only West Division/1967 expansion team to reach a Cup final (they won).

A significant controversy arose before the playoffs. With 4 games to play, the Minnesota North Stars were in 3rd place with a record of 28–30–16 for 72 points while the Philadelphia Flyers were in 4th at 26–33–15 for 67 points. Minnesota then lost their final four games while the Flyers went 2–0–2 to jump ahead of Minnesota in the final standings by 1 point. It was widely rumored that Minnesota did so to avoid playing the far superior Chicago Black Hawks, since at this time in the playoffs the first place team played the third place team and the second played the fourth. Nothing was proven against the North Stars (who defeated their first round opponents, St. Louis, four games to two, while the Flyers were swept by the powerful Black Hawks), but the format was changed the following year to the 1 vs. 4/2 vs. 3 format that prevailed thereafter.

Playoff bracket

Quarterfinals

(E1) Boston Bruins vs. (E3) Montreal Canadiens

The Boston Bruins finished first in the league with 121 points. The Montreal Canadiens finished third in the East Division with 97 points. This was the fifteenth playoff series between these two teams with Montreal winning twelve of the fourteen previous series. They last met in the 1969 Stanley Cup Semifinals which Montreal won in six games. Boston won five of the six games in this year's regular season series.

The Montreal Canadiens were matched against the Boston Bruins, and in one of the most extraordinary upsets in hockey history, Ken Dryden was hot in goal for the Canadiens as they ousted the Bruins in seven games. Game 2 featured what many perceive as one of the greatest comebacks in NHL history. With the Bruins leading 5–2 heading into the third period, the Canadiens, who had trailed 5–1, scored 5 goals in the final session to win 7–5. The prominent Canadian sports journalist Red Fisher lists the Canadiens' comeback has the 8th most memorable moment in his over 49 years of covering hockey. In game 4, Bobby Orr became the first defenceman to get a hat trick in a playoff game when Boston won 5–2.

(E2) New York Rangers vs. (E4) Toronto Maple Leafs

The New York Rangers finished second in the East Division with 109 points. The Toronto Maple Leafs finished fourth with 82 points. This was the eighth playoff meeting between these two teams with New York winning four of the seven previous series. They last met in the 1962 Stanley Cup Semifinals which Toronto won in six games. New York won five of the six games in this year's regular season series.

(W1) Chicago Black Hawks vs. (W3) Philadelphia Flyers

The Chicago Black Hawks finished first in the West Division with 107 points. The Philadelphia Flyers finished third in the West Division with 73 points. This was the first playoff meeting between these two teams. Chicago won this year's six game regular season series earning nine of twelve points.

(W2) St. Louis Blues vs. (W4) Minnesota North Stars

The St. Louis Blues finished second in the West Division with 87 points. The Minnesota North Stars finished fourth in the West Division with 72 points. This was the third playoff meeting between these two teams with St. Louis winning both of the previous series. They met in the previous year's Stanley Cup Quarterfinals which the Blues won in six games. Minnesota won this year's six game regular season series earning eight of twelve points.

Semifinals

(E3) Montreal Canadiens vs. (W4) Minnesota North Stars

This was the first playoff series between these two teams. Montreal won this year's six game regular season series earning eight of twelve points.

The Canadiens' upset of Boston was so sensational that the Canadiens nearly suffered a fatal letdown against the Minnesota North Stars. The Canadiens' 6–3 loss in Montreal on April 22 to Minnesota, led by the goaltending of Cesare Maniago was the first playoff defeat for an Original Six team at the hands of a 1967 Expansion franchise.

(W1) Chicago Black Hawks vs. (E2) New York Rangers

This was the third playoff series between these two teams with Chicago winning both previous series. They last met in the 1968 Stanley Cup Quarterfinals which the Black Hawks won in six games. The teams split this year's six-game regular season series.

Bobby Hull and the Chicago Black Hawks were just too much for the Rangers and the Black Hawks advanced to the finals in seven games. Hull won two games with goals on face-offs, despite Glen Sather's coverage to check him.

Stanley Cup Finals

This was the fifteenth series between these two teams with the Montreal Canadiens winning nine of the fourteen previous series. They last met in the 1968 Stanley Cup Semifinals which Montreal won in five games. The teams split this year's six-game regular season series.

The series went the full seven games, with the Canadiens winning in Chicago despite trailing 2–0 halfway into the second period of game seven. Jacques Lemaire took a shot from centre ice that miraculously escaped goaltender Tony Esposito cutting the Black Hawks' lead to 2–1. Henri Richard tied the game just before the end of the second period, and scored again 02:34 into the third, giving the Habs the lead. Montreal goalie Ken Dryden kept Chicago off the board for the rest of the game, and the Habs won their third Stanley Cup in four years. It was the final game for Canadiens superstar and captain Jean Beliveau who retired after the season. The Canadiens were the last road team to win a Game 7 of a Stanley Cup Final until the Pittsburgh Penguins in 2009. It was Al MacNeil's final game as Montreal coach — after he had benched Richard for Game 5, The Pocket Rocket declared "[MacNeil] is the worst coach I ever played for!" Although Richard retracted his "angry comment", as he called it, MacNeil still resigned.

Awards
A new award for the most outstanding player as voted by the members of the NHL Players Association, the Lester B. Pearson Award, was introduced this season and the first winner was Phil Esposito.

All-Star teams

Player statistics

Scoring leaders

Source: NHL.

Leading goaltenders

Note: GP = Games played; Min – Minutes played; GA = Goals against; GAA = Goals against average; W = Wins; L = Losses; T = Ties; SO = Shutouts

Other statistics
 Plus/minus leader: Bobby Orr, Boston Bruins

Coaches

East
Boston Bruins: Tom Johnson
Buffalo Sabres: George "Punch" Imlach
Detroit Red Wings:  Ned Harkness and Doug Barkley 
Montreal Canadiens: Claude Ruel and Al MacNeil
New York Rangers: Emile Francis
Toronto Maple Leafs: John McLellan
Vancouver Canucks: Hal Laycoe

West
California Golden Seals: Fred Glover
Chicago Black Hawks: Billy Reay
Los Angeles Kings: Larry Regan
Minnesota North Stars: Jack Gordon
Philadelphia Flyers: Vic Stasiuk
Pittsburgh Penguins: Red Kelly
St. Louis Blues: Scotty Bowman and Al Arbour

Debuts
The following is a list of players of note who played their first NHL game in 1970–71 (listed with their first team, asterisk(*) marks debut in playoffs):
Reggie Leach, Boston Bruins
Ivan Boldirev, Boston Bruins
Gilbert Perreault, Buffalo Sabres
Jerry Korab, Chicago Black Hawks
Gilles Meloche, Chicago Black Hawks
Ken Dryden, Montreal Canadiens
Rick MacLeish, Philadelphia Flyers
Curt Bennett, St. Louis Blues
Rene Robert, Toronto Maple Leafs
Darryl Sittler, Toronto Maple Leafs
Dale Tallon, Vancouver Canucks

Last games
The following is a list of players of note that played their last game in the NHL in 1970–71 (listed with their last team):
Jean-Guy Talbot, Buffalo Sabres
Jean Beliveau, Montreal Canadiens
John Ferguson, Montreal Canadiens
Andy Bathgate, Pittsburgh Penguins
Glenn Hall, St. Louis Blues
George Armstrong, Toronto Maple Leafs
Charlie Hodge, Vancouver Canucks
NOTE:  Bathgate would finish his major professional career in the World Hockey Association.

See also 
 List of Stanley Cup champions
 1970 NHL Amateur Draft
 1970 NHL Expansion Draft
 1970–71 NHL transactions
 24th National Hockey League All-Star Game
 National Hockey League All-Star Game
 1970 in sports
 1971 in sports

References
 
 
 
 

Notes

External links
Hockey Database
NHL.com
hickoksports.com

 
1970–71 in Canadian ice hockey by league
1970–71 in American ice hockey by league